The Moneylender's Daughter (German: Die Tochter des Wucherers) is a 1922 German silent film directed by Fritz Bernhardt and starring Lee Parry, Max Wogritsch and Olaf Storm.

Cast
 Lee Parry as Thoea Nothmer 
 Max Wogritsch as Graf Lothar von Rüstow 
 Olaf Storm as Dr. Kurt Holgers 
 Josef Commer as Pank Feldern, Agent 
 Syme Delmar as Irene Hansen 
 Rudolf Klein-Rhoden as Bankier Michael Bothmer 
 Paul Ludwig as Franz Scherneck 
 Gerhard Ritterband as Sepp Hinterwurzer 
 Aruth Wartan as Heino Bothmer

References

Bibliography
 Bock, Hans-Michael & Bergfelder, Tim. The Concise CineGraph. Encyclopedia of German Cinema. Berghahn Books, 2009.

External links

1922 films
Films of the Weimar Republic
Films directed by Fritz Bernhardt
German silent feature films
German black-and-white films